Utricularia raynalii is a small, annual, suspended aquatic carnivorous plant that belongs to the genus Utricularia. U. raynalii is endemic to tropical Africa and can be found in Burkina Faso, Cameroon, the Central African Republic, Chad, Rwanda, Senegal, and Sudan. It was described by Peter Taylor in 1986 and was named in honor of Jean Raynal of the Paris Herbarium who had collected this species in Cameroon and Rwanda.

See also 
 List of Utricularia species

References 

Carnivorous plants of Africa
Flora of Burkina Faso
Flora of Cameroon
Flora of Chad
Flora of Rwanda
Flora of Senegal
Flora of Sudan
Flora of the Central African Republic
raynalii